Punjab Sports University, officially Maharaja Bhupinder Singh Punjab Sports University (MBSPSU), is a residential and affiliating sports state university in Patiala, Punjab, India.

History 
A sports university in Punjab was announced by the Government of Punjab in June 2017. In July 2019 it was decided to name it after Maharaja Bhupinder Singh. It was established in August 2019 thorough The Maharaja Bhupinder Singh Punjab Sports University Act, 2019 and approved by the University Grants Commission (UGC) in September of that year. Jagbir Singh Cheema was appointed the first Vice-Chancellor.

Campus
The university was started from a transit campus at Prof. Gursewak Singh Government College of Physical Education.

References

External links
 

Universities in Punjab, India
Education in Patiala
Physical Education and Sports universities in India
2019 establishments in Punjab, India
Educational institutions established in 2019